Charles H. “Tom” Sawyer (January 24, 1915 Ludlow, Vermont - June 20, 2006 Irvine, California) was an American neuroendocrinologist and Distinguished Emeritus Professor of Neurobiology at the University of California, Los Angeles. Sawyer was considered a pioneer in the field of neuroendocrinology.

At the age of 91, he died of Alzheimer’s.

Career
Sawyer’s work at UCLA was crucial in the treatment of infertility and birth control pills.

His research showed that ovulation was controlled by the hypothalamus which was controlled by a circadian clock.   He also showed  norepinephrine role in ovulation as well as oestradiol in stimulating the nervous system.

References

1915 births
American endocrinologists
2006 deaths
American neuroscientists
University of California, Los Angeles faculty
Yale Graduate School of Arts and Sciences alumni
Middlebury College alumni
People from Ludlow (town), Vermont
Deaths from Alzheimer's disease